Berndt Seite (born 22 April 1940 in Hahnswalde, Trebnitz) is a German politician. He was the 2nd minister president  of Mecklenburg-Vorpommern from 1992 to 1998 and the 45th president of the German Bundesrat in 1992.

Life 
Seite has been a member of the Christian Democratic Union since 1990.

References 

The information in this article is based on that of its German equivalent.
 Dr Berndt Seite at Regierungsportal Mecklenburg-Vorpommern

External links 
 

Presidents of the German Bundesrat
Members of the Landtag of Mecklenburg-Western Pomerania
Christian Democratic Union of Germany politicians
People from Trzebnica
People from the Province of Silesia
1940 births
Living people
Ministers-President of Mecklenburg-Western Pomerania
Knights Commander of the Order of Merit of the Federal Republic of Germany